The discography of American singer Aloe Blacc consists of five studio albums, five extended plays and 47 singles. On July 11, 2006, he released his first LP album, Shine Through. He then toured across Europe and the US with Emanon, while working on his second solo album. In 2010, Blacc released his second album, Good Things, on Stones Throw records. The first single "I Need a Dollar", made major chart success in over 15 countries in Europe, peaking number 2 on the UK Singles Chart and also charting in the top 20 in Australia and New Zealand. He later released a second single from the album, "Loving You Is Killing Me" which also attained chart success in Austria, Germany and Switzerland. In 2013, Blacc collaborated with Swedish DJ/Producer Avicii on a song titled "Wake Me Up!" for the first single from Avicii's debut studio album True. Blacc partnered up with Coca-Cola in 2014 and released an exclusive charity single titled "Together (RED)". The money paid for the song was donated to AIDS research.

Studio albums

Extended plays

Singles

As lead artist

As featured artist

Guest appearances

See also 
 Aloe Blacc

Notes

References

External links
 Official website
 Aloe Blacc at AllMusic
 
 

Discographies of American artists
Rhythm and blues discographies
Soul music discographies